Trigonopterus echinatus is a species of flightless weevil in the genus Trigonopterus from Indonesia.

Etymology
The specific name is derived from the Latin word echinatus, meaning "prickly".  It refers to the species' spiny scales.

Description
Individuals measure 1.72–2.04 mm in length.  Body is slightly oval in shape.  General coloration black, dull on the pronotum and with a bronze tint on the elytra, head and legs rust-colored.  The elytra is patterned with deep punctures, each accompanied by a spine-like scale.

Range

References

echinatus
Beetles described in 2014
Beetles of Asia
Insects of Indonesia